Jean-Luc Rougé (born 30 May 1949, Clichy, Hauts-de-Seine) is a French judoka. He competed at the 1976 Summer Olympics and the 1980 Summer Olympics.

Biography 
Fighting in the under 93 kg weight division, Rougé was the first French judoka to win gold medal at the World Judo Championships in 1975. He was elected president of the French Judo Federation in 2005, replacing Michel Vial. He was also a candidate for the 1993 French parliamentary elections under the banner of Rassemblement par le sport.  On 23 November 2013 Rougé was promoted to the rank of 9th dan.

A Harai goshi specialist, Rougé wrote a comprehensive book on the technique.

Awards 
 World Judo Championships
  Gold medal in the 93 kg-World Championship in Vienna in 1975.
  Silver medal in 95 kg to World Championship in Paris in 1979.
  Bronze medal in open category in the World Championship in Paris in 1979.

References

External links

 
 
 
 

French male judoka
Living people
1949 births
Sportspeople from Clichy, Hauts-de-Seine
Judoka at the 1976 Summer Olympics
Judoka at the 1980 Summer Olympics
Olympic judoka of France
20th-century French people